Emilia Johanna Fester (born 28 April 1998) is a German politician of the Alliance 90/The Greens who has been serving as a Member of the German Bundestag since the 2021 federal election.

Political career
At age 23, Fester is the Baby of the House in the 20th Bundestag. She is her parliamentary group's spokesperson for youth issues.

Personal life
In Berlin, Fester shares an apartment with fellow parliamentarians Marlene Schönberger and Saskia Weishaupt.

References 

Living people
1998 births
21st-century German women politicians
Members of the Bundestag 2021–2025
Female members of the Bundestag
Members of the Bundestag for Hamburg
Members of the Bundestag for Alliance 90/The Greens
German feminists
LGBT members of the Bundestag
German LGBT politicians
Lesbian politicians